Kodiyalam Vasudeva Aiyangar was an Indian politician who served as a member of the Madras Legislative Council from 1903 to 1906.

Year of death missing
Members of the Tamil Nadu Legislative Council
Year of birth missing